Murarbaji Deshpande (17th century) was a general in the early Maratha Empire during the reign of Chatrapati Shivaji. He is best remembered for his defense of the Purandar Fort against Dilir Khan, a Mughal general who accompanied Jai Singh I in the 17th-century siege on Purandar.

Early life

Murarbaji Deshpande was born into a Chandraseniya Kayastha Prabhu family and his native land was the Javali Satara District. He was the gallant commander who commanded 700  (maratha troop) to attack Diler Khan.

Battle of Purandar

The battle for Purandar fort was a landmark battle of symbolic importance for both the Marathas and Mughals. It was essential for the Marathas to hold off the Mughals for as long as possible, thus demonstrating the difficulty of conquering the mountainous Maratha Empire. It was equally imperative for the Mughals to conquer Purandar as swiftly as possible to demonstrate the futility of resistance of the dominant Mughal empire.

In the end, superior European cannons fielded by the Mughals, under the leadership of the European mercenary Mannucci, blasted away the walls of Purandar. In spite of crumbling defenses, Murarbaji and his troops sustained a dogged defense. When the Mughals breached the outer walls, Murarbaji and his soldiers, though overwhelmingly outnumbered, mounted a fierce counterattack. Maratha folk history mentions that Murarbaji showed incredible skills as a swordsman and was an aggressive and inspiring leader who pushed back and caused a retreat of a larger Mughal force.

Diler Khan, impressed with the bravery of Murarbaji, offered him a truce and employment in the Mughal forces with a handsome salary. Murarbaji turned down the offer due to his loyalty to the ideals of Hindavi Swarajya. He was extremely enraged at this very suggestion and in an act of extreme daredevilry charged with his commandos right into the heart of the Mughal troops, killing hundreds. The remaining Marathas retreated inside the inner walls (baalekilla) of the fort, refusing to surrender and willing to fight to the last man.

The battle of Purandar, made the Marathas realize the difficulty, facing the overwhelming force led by Mirza Raja Jai Singh, but also revealed to the Mughals the tenacity of the Marathas. Thereafter Shivaji agreed to surrender to Mirza Raja rather than risk the decimation of his forces and the ruin of his homeland. Aurangzeb sought to sign the treaty of Purandar and invited Shivaji to Agra rather than face a protracted and expensive campaign to conquer Marathas. As a part of the settlement Chatrapati Shivaji agreed to give up 23 of his forts and 4,00,000 hons to the Mughals.

In popular culture 

 In 2023, Veer Murarbaji is an upcoming Indian Marathi language historical drama film based on Deshpande's life, produced by Almond Creations and AA Films.

References

Military history of India
Indian military leaders
People of the Maratha Empire
Marathi people
People from Maharashtra
People from Satara district
17th-century Indian people